Sanda Dubravčić-Šimunjak (born 24 August 1964) is a Croatian physician and former figure skater who competed internationally for Yugoslavia. She is the 1981 European silver medalist.

Personal life 
Sanda Dubravčić was born on 24 August 1964 in Zagreb, SR Croatia, Yugoslavia, to Zora (née Lipošćak) and Dragutin Dubravčić. She is a medical doctor and married Boris Šimunjak in 1991.

Career 
In 1976, Dubravčić finished seventh at the inaugural World Junior Championships, held in Megève,  France. Her senior ISU Championship debut came at the 1977 Europeans in Helsinki, Finland.

Dubravčić represented Yugoslavia at the 1980 Winter Olympics in Lake Placid, New York; she finished 11th overall after placing 13th in compulsory figures, tenth in the short program, and eighth in the free skate. At the 1981 European Championships in Innsbruck, she ranked fifth in figures and second in the next two segments. She was awarded the silver medal, having finished between Denise Biellmann of Switzerland and Claudia Kristofics-Binder of Austria.

Dubravčić was the final Olympic torchbearer at the 1984 Winter Olympics in Sarajevo. She ended up tenth overall after placing eighth in figures, ninth in the short, and ninth in the free. Concluding her career, she finished ninth at the 1984 World Championships in Ottawa, Canada.

Dubravčić has served as an international judge and as a member of the ISU Council's medical commission.

Competitive highlights

References

 

Croatian female single skaters
Yugoslav female single skaters
Figure skaters at the 1980 Winter Olympics
Figure skaters at the 1984 Winter Olympics
Olympic figure skaters of Yugoslavia
Figure skating officials
Living people
1964 births
European Figure Skating Championships medalists
Sportspeople from Zagreb
Olympic cauldron lighters